The 1936 United States presidential election in Georgia took place on November 3, 1936, as part of the wider United States presidential election. Voters chose 12 representatives, or electors, to the Electoral College, who voted for president and vice president.

Background
With the exception of a handful of historically Unionist North Georgia counties – chiefly Fannin but also to a lesser extent Pickens, Gilmer and Towns – Georgia since the 1880s had been a one-party state dominated by the Democratic Party. Disfranchisement of almost all African-Americans and most poor whites had made the Republican Party virtually nonexistent outside of local governments in those few hill counties, and the national Democratic Party served as the guardian of white supremacy against a Republican Party historically associated with memories of Reconstruction. The only competitive elections were Democratic primaries, which state laws restricted to whites on the grounds of the Democratic Party being legally a private club.

Vote
On election day, the Democratic ticket of incumbent President Franklin D. Roosevelt and Vice President John N. Garner carried the state of Georgia in a landslide, defeating Republican Alf Landon by a margin of nearly 75 percentage points and sweeping all but one county in the state. Even amidst a national Democratic landslide, Roosevelt's margin in Georgia exceeded his margin nationwide by more than 50 percentage points.

Results

Results by congressional districts

Results by county

Notes

References

Georgia
1936
1936 Georgia (U.S. state) elections